State Route 196 (SR 196) is a  state highway in the eastern part of the U.S. state of Georgia. Its routing is located within portions of Tattnall, Long, and Liberty counties. It connects the Glennville and Hinesville areas.

Route description
SR 196 begins at an intersection with US 23/US 301/SR 23/SR 57 southwest of Glennville. The highway heads southeast and enters Long County. SR 196 heads eastward, traveling through rural areas of the county, before gradually heading southeast once again. Just after entering Liberty County, it turns first to the southeast and then to the northeast until it enters Hinesville. Just after it enters town, it meets SR 119 and runs concurrent with SR 119 into Hinesville, where it departs to the northwest, to enter Fort Stewart. In the main part of the town, the highway intersects US 84/SR 38. It continues heading northeast until it meets its eastern terminus, an intersection with US 17/SR 25 southwest of Richmond Hill.

Major intersections

See also

References

External links

 Georgia Roads (Routes 181 - 200)
 Georgia State Route 196 on State-Ends.com

196
Transportation in Tattnall County, Georgia
Transportation in Long County, Georgia
Transportation in Liberty County, Georgia